Sena is one of eleven parishes (administrative divisions) in the municipality of Ibias, within the province and autonomous community of Asturias, in northern Spain.

Villages and hamlets
 Barca 
 Bustelin 
 Castaosa 
 Penedela 
 Riodeporcos 
 Salvador 
 Santiso 
 Sena

References

Parishes in Ibias